Amblyseius sumatrensis is a species of mite in the family Phytoseiidae.

References

sumatrensis
Articles created by Qbugbot
Animals described in 2002